Markus Uusitalo (born 15 May 1997) is a Finnish professional footballer who plays for SJK, as a goalkeeper.

Career
On 13 November 2019 FC Honka confirmed that Uusitalo would join the club for the 2020 season, signing a deal until the end of the year. He moved on loan to HIFK for the 2021 season. After the 2021 season, he signed for SJK.

References

External links

1997 births
Living people
Finnish footballers
Pallohonka players
FC Honka players
Vaasan Palloseura players
FC Kiisto players
Helsingin Jalkapalloklubi players
HIFK Fotboll players
Klubi 04 players
Kakkonen players
Veikkausliiga players
Association football goalkeepers
Seinäjoen Jalkapallokerho players
Footballers from Espoo